Yoo Sung-eun (Hangul: 유성은, born April 26, 1989), stylized as U Sung-eun, is a South Korean singer. She was the runner-up on The Voice of Korea. She released her debut album, Be OK, on July 15, 2013.

Personal life
Yoo married rapper Louie of Geeks on July 11, 2021.

Discography

Extended plays

Singles

Collaborations

Soundtrack appearances

References

External links

1989 births
Living people
South Korean women pop singers
South Korean female idols
The Voice of Korea contestants
21st-century South Korean singers
21st-century South Korean women singers